The 1918 Rose Bowl, known at the time as the Tournament East-West Football Game, was a bowl game played on January 1, 1918, at Tournament Park in Pasadena, California. It was the 4th Rose Bowl Game. With America at war, the game was played with players from the Mare Island Marines of California and the Camp Lewis Army from American Lake, Washington.

Game summary
Since the Rose Bowl game became so popular and most of the college football players were fighting overseas during World War I, the Pasadena Tournament of Roses decided to stage the game with military units, with the approval from President Woodrow Wilson. The Camp Lewis football team represented the US Army.

Scoring

Game notes
According to the Tournament of Roses, "Within weeks of the 1918 Rose Bowl Game, the majority of the players from both teams were scheduled to go overseas. John Beckett, left tackle for Mare Island, acknowledged this fact and said that “this would be the last battle that we would fight in the name of sports."

Hugo Bezdek was the coach to lead two separate schools (Oregon in 1917 and Mare Island in 1918) to victories. He also led Penn State to an appearance in the 1923 Rose Bowl.

Dick Romney, who had been a football star at Utah, played halfback for the Camp Lewis team, scoring the team's only touchdown.

References

Rose Bowl
Rose Bowl Game
Mare Island Marines football
Military competitions in American football
1918 in sports in California
January 1918 sports events